Anders Riise (born 25 January 1969) is a Norwegian politician for the Conservative Party.

He served as a deputy representative to the Parliament of Norway from Møre og Romsdal during the term 2017–2021. He became mayor of Hareid in 2011, and is also a member of Møre og Romsdal county council.

References

1969 births
Living people
People from Hareid
Deputy members of the Storting
Conservative Party (Norway) politicians
Mayors of places in Møre og Romsdal